Ortved is a small village with a population of only 247 (1 January 2022) in Ringsted Municipality in the central part of the island of Zealand, Denmark, and is a part of region Sjælland. It lies on Roskildevejen main road close to the city of Ringsted.
Ortved is also the village with Denmark's 5th most popular camping.

References

Cities and towns in Region Zealand
Ringsted Municipality